Olympic Park or Olympic Village is a rectangular football ground located in Heidelberg West on the western fringe of the  City of Banyule, was built for the 1956 Olympic Games in Melbourne,  Australia.  The park is an established sport and community recreation reserve with a significant history and was once used as a prominent training base for the 1956 Olympic Games. Olympic Park is home to Heidelberg United FC in the National Premier Leagues is now a high-profile soccer and cricket venue which also provides a range of other sport, recreation and open space opportunities.

The adjacent residential area was the athletes village is now known as Olympic Village.

The Olympic Park is also home to Barrbunin Beek, a gathering place for Aboriginal and Torres Strait Islander people living in and around Banyule. The increased demand to provide functional and appropriate levels of sport and recreation infrastructure, and the shift towards more informal and casual recreation pursuits,  prompted Council to develop a Master Plan for Olympic Park.

In 2020 the park was renovated to include a football(soccer) field. The original athletics track is still was decomishend as it was in poor condition. The total capacity of the ground is 12,000.

A crowd of 11,372 people turned up to watch the 2015 FFA Cup quarter final match between Heidelberg United and Melbourne City. This was the second highest crowd in FFA Cup history.

References

External links

Shaping Banyule; Olympic Park Master Plan
Heidelberg United FC

Soccer venues in Melbourne
Sports venues in Melbourne
Heidelberg United FC
Sport in the City of Banyule
Buildings and structures in the City of Banyule